is a traditional Japanese steam bending wood craft found in Odate, Akita Prefecture, Japan. The Magewappa products are known for the brilliant elegance of their straight grain, and the light yet rich color.

History
Magewappa was first made by woodcutters in the Odate area, using straight grain Akita Cedar. The Lord of Odate Castle, Nishiie Satake, encouraged this use of the soldiers and has been passed on from generation to generation from the end of the Edo period to the present. With the emergence of plastics, it became economically necessary for some craftsmen to change their business. Since then more people are becoming aware of real quality and craftsmanship. Odate Magewappa fits this description perfectly.

Process
For more than four hundred years the people of the area have exploited mountains, planted Japanese cedars, and repeated the process of weeding, pruning, and thinning out the forests every year to protect the beauty and health of the environment for the next generation

Trees
Out of four hundred saplings of Akita cedar planted, less than thirty might be found suitable to make products. Only Akita cedars over one hundred years old, which have survived the very severe weather conditions of northern Japan, can be bent in the manufacturing process mentioned above. Ones with a knot or even slight discoloration cannot be used.

External links
 Odate Magewappa

See also 
Birch bark

Bento
Culture in Akita Prefecture
Food storage containers
Japanese woodwork
Japanese cuisine terms
Meals
Serving and dining